Adam Faul (18 April 1929 – 19 March 2016) was a Canadian boxer. He competed in the men's heavyweight event at the 1948 Summer Olympics. He was inducted into the Saskatchewan Sports Hall of Fame in 1976.

1948 Olympic results
Below is the record of Adam Faul, a Canadian heavyweight boxer who competed at the 1948 London Olympics:

 Round of 32: bye
 Round of 16: defeated Victor Bignon (Chile) on points
 Quarterfinal: lost to Gunnar Nilsson (Sweden) on points

References

External links
 

1929 births
2016 deaths
Canadian male boxers
Olympic boxers of Canada
Boxers at the 1948 Summer Olympics
Sportspeople from Regina, Saskatchewan
Heavyweight boxers